Luis David Martínez and Felipe Meligeni Alves were the defending champions but chose to defend their title with different partners. Martínez partnered Fernando Romboli but lost in the semifinals to Nicolás Barrientos and Alejandro Gómez. Meligeni Alves partnered Rafael Matos but withdrew before the final due to a positive test for COVID-19.

Barrientos and Gómez won the title by walkover after Matos and Meligeni Alves withdrew before the final.

Seeds

Draw

References

External links
 Main draw

São Paulo Challenger de Tênis - Doubles
2021 Doubles